Powderworks Records as Powderworks Records & Tapes Pty Limited was an Australian record label established in 1977, head-quartered in Brisbane. It was owned by members of Midnight Oil and their talent manager, Gary Morris. Aside from recording, it made the Australian pressings of works on other labels, including RCA, Columbia and Mute Records from 1978 to 1987. In February 1988 a liquidator was appointed by the Supreme Court of New South Wales.

Artists

 Foster and Allen – "Maggie (When You and I Were Young)" (1979)
 Lena Horne – Stormy Weather: Lena Horne's Greatest Hits (1982) (POW 3006)
Exude
Midnight Oil
Outline
Vanessa Amorosi
Warumpi Band – Big Name, No Blankets (1985) (POW 6098)

References

External links 

Powderworks on MySpace
Powderworks on Discogs (1977 - 1987)

Australian independent record labels
Indie rock record labels
Companies based in Brisbane